The Bazaar Mosque, also known as Memi Bey Mosque, is a mosque located in Gjirokastër, Albania.

History 

The Memi Bey mosque was built in 1757 and is located in the Old Bazaar neighbourhood. It is one of fifteen mosques originally built in the city during the Ottoman era, of which thirteen survived till the communist period.

The mosque was originally designed to be located in the New Bazaar neighbourhood of Gjirokastër, as part of Memi Pasha's urban plan, that was built in the 17th century. It was, however, destroyed by fire in the following century, with the exception of the mosque.

The mosque was elevated to "Cultural Monument" (Monumente Kulturore) status by the Albanian government in 1973, sparing its destruction by the totalitarian communist regime of Albania. The remaining twelve mosques were subsequently demolished. Because of a religion ban in Albania, the mosque was used as a training hall for circus acrobats who made use of the high domed ceilings to hang their trapezes.

Nearby the mosque is a two-story octagonal building, constructed in 1727. Although originally used as a Bektashi cemevi, it was closed down during the communist period. It is currently used as a madrasah.

See also
 Islam in Albania

References 

Ottoman architecture in Albania
1757 establishments in the Ottoman Empire
Mosques in Albania
Buildings and structures in Gjirokastër
Mosques completed in 1757